Bol is a municipality on the south of the island of Brač in the Split-Dalmatia County of Croatia, population 1,630 (2011).

Bol (its name is derived from the Latin word "vallum") is renowned for its most popular beach, the Zlatni Rat ("Golden cape").  It is a promontory composed mostly of pebble rock that visibly shifts with the tidal movement. The Adriatic Sea water at Zlatni Rat is clear and somewhat cold, due to the strong current of the strait it is situated in. There is a beach on either side of the horn. Bol itself is a popular tourist destination, known for its harbourside bars and restaurants, and wind surfing conditions.

The Dominican church in Bol contains a number of paintings by Tripo Kokolja.



International relations

Twin towns — Sister cities
Bol is twinned with:

  Omiš, Croatia

See also 
 Croatian Bol Ladies Open

References

External links
 

 
Dalmatia
Municipalities of Croatia
Brač
Populated places in Split-Dalmatia County
Populated coastal places in Croatia